Abraham Girardet (30 November 1764, Le Locle - 2 January 1823, Paris) was a Swiss engraver and illustrator.

Biography 
He was the eldest son of the publisher and bookseller, Samuel Girardet (1730-1807). In 1783, he moved to Paris, where he took lessons in drawing and printmaking from Bénédict Alphonse Nicollet (1743-1807), a fellow Swiss immigrant. His siblings, Abraham Louis, Alexandre, Charles Samuel, and Julie (1769-1817) also worked as engravers.

He remained in Paris during the early stages of the Revolution, creating depictions of major events. From 1792 to 1794, however, he returned to Switzerland and became a teacher in Neuchâtel. This was followed by an extended trip to Italy. When he returned to Paris in 1795, he focused on making prints.  

Many of his best known engravings are taken from the Old Masters; notably, the Transfiguration (after Raphael), the Rape of the Sabine Women (after Nicolas Poussin), the Triumph of Titus and Vespasia (after Giulio Romano) and the Dead Savior (after Andrea del Sarto).

He received awards at the Salon in 1806 and 1808. In his later years, he was a drawing teacher at the Gobelins Manufactory.

Sources 
 
 
 René Burnand: L’étonnante histoire des Girardet. Artistes suisses. La Baconnière, Neuchâtel 1940.
 René Burnand: Les Girardet au Locle et dans le monde. Éd. de la Baconnière, Neuchâtel 1957.

External links 

 More works by Girardet @ ArtNet

1764 births
1823 deaths
Swiss engravers
Swiss printmakers

People from Le Locle